Cantieri Riuniti dell'Adriatico ("United Shipbuilders of the Adriatic") was an Italian manufacturer in the sea and air industry which was active from 1930 to 1966. This shipyard is now owned by Fincantieri.

History
In 1930, Stabilimento Tecnico Triestino based at Trieste merged with another Italian company, the Cantiere Navale Triestino of Monfalcone, forming the Cantieri Riuniti dell'Adriatico (CRDA). The new company built a number of light and heavy cruisers for the Regia Marina (Royal Italian Navy) between the wars, as well as some 27 submarines. The ocean liner Conte di Savoia was also constructed in 1932.

During the World War II, CRDA Trieste built two battleships for the Regia Marina, Vittorio Veneto and Roma. CRDA survived the postwar shakeup in the shipbuilding industry and went on to build several more commercial liners in the 1950s and 1960s, as well as a few naval vessels. In 1984, CRDA was sold to the Fincantieri Group.

For the Olympic regattas of 1960 the firm produced 55 Finn sailboats for the single-handed event in the Gulf of Naples.

Ships built
The following table lists ships built at the former STT shipyards after the company's 1929 merger with Cantieri Navale Triestino to form CRDA.

Reference: Winklareth p. 292-293

See also 
Cantiere Navale Triestino
Stabilimento Tecnico Triestino

References

Bibliography
 

 
1930 establishments in Italy
1966 disestablishments in Italy
Vehicle manufacturing companies established in 1930
Vehicle manufacturing companies disestablished in 1966
Shipbuilding companies of Italy
Italian brands
Fincantieri